B. M. Suhara is a Malayalam writer from Kerala, India. She was born in Thikkodi near Calicut.

Awards 
1992 – Lalithambika Antharjanam Memorial Special Award for outstanding creative talent in the field of Malayalam fiction and short story.
2004 – K. Balakrishanan Smaraka Award for total contribution to Malayalam Literature
2006 – Unnimoy Memorial Award for total contribution to Malayalam Literature
2008 – Kerala Sahitya Akademi Award for total contribution to Malayalam Literature

Published works

References

Further reading
 Ummakkuttiyude Kunhikkinavukal – B. M. Suhara's memoirs serialised in Madhyamam Weekly: 1, 2, 3, 4, 5, 6, 7, 8, 9, 10, 11, 12, 13, 14, 15, 16, 17, 18, 19

1952 births
Living people
Malayalam novelists
Malayalam short story writers
People from Kozhikode district
Recipients of the Kerala Sahitya Akademi Award
Indian women short story writers
Indian women novelists
20th-century Indian novelists
21st-century Indian novelists
20th-century Indian short story writers
21st-century Indian short story writers
Novelists from Kerala
20th-century Indian women writers
21st-century Indian women writers
21st-century Indian writers
Women writers from Kerala